"Strutter" is a 1974 song by Kiss.

Strutter may also refer to:

Film and television
 Strutter (TV series), a 2006–2007 MTV series starring Paul Kaye
 Strutter, a 2012 film by Allison Anders
 Strutter, a fictional character in the film Time Bandits

Other uses
 Sopwith 1½ Strutter, a British World War I-era biplane
 Texas State University Strutters, an American collegiate dance team
 Strutter, Greek musician, bassist for the metal band Wardrum

See also
 Strut (disambiguation)
 Stutter (disambiguation)